Aide Brown Ideye (born 11 October 1988) is a Nigerian professional footballer who plays as a striker for Kuwaiti Division One club Al-Yarmouk.

Club career

Early career
Ideye began his career with Bayelsa United before moving to Ocean Boys. He was a member of the Ocean Boys team that won the Nigerian Premier League.

Ideye moved in January 2008 to Europe to sign with Swiss Super League club Neuchâtel Xamax. Before this move to Switzerland, he was on trial with Dutch side Willem II, but was not signed. After three years with Xamax, Ideye left to sign for French Ligue 1 club Sochaux.

Dynamo Kyiv
On 6 July 2011, Ideye signed a five-year deal with Ukrainian side Dynamo Kyiv. He made his first appearance on 16 July against Oleksandria, scoring two goals. In his second game for Dynamo, he again scored a brace, this time against Obolon Kyiv. On 7 August 2012, Ideye scored the winner in a UEFA Champions League qualifying third round second-leg game against Feyenoord, in which Dynamo ultimately progressed. He also scored against Borussia Mönchengladbach in the second-leg of the play-off round. Mönchengladbach won the game 2–1, but Kyiv progressed to the Champions League group stage on a 4–3 aggregate score. On 15 May 2014, Ideye was an unused substitute in Dynamo's 2–1 win over Shakhtar Donetsk in the 2014 Ukrainian Cup Final.

West Bromwich Albion
On 18 July 2014, Ideye signed a three-year deal with English Premier League club West Bromwich Albion, becoming the club's record signing at a fee reported as £10 million. The contract included an option in the club's favour for an extra year. After a difficult start to the season in England, Ideye scored his first league goal for the club in their 3–1 loss to Manchester City on Boxing Day 2014, and scored four times in a six-day spell in February 2015 with goals against Burnley and Swansea City in the Premier League and two against West Ham United in the FA Cup.

Olympiacos 
On 31 August 2015, Ideye joined Olympiacos from West Brom for an undisclosed fee, though believed to be around €6 million. The prospect of featuring in the Champions League again was rumoured to play a crucial role in convincing Ideye to move to the Athens-based club.

On 20 October 2015, Ideye scored a goal in Olympiacos' Champions League group stage victory over Dinamo Zagreb (1–0). He scored the 79th-minute winner with a superb finish from a tight angle, redeeming himself for an astonishing miss earlier in the second half. On 9 March 2016, Ideye received a lucrative offer from China during the January transfer window, however he rejected the offer as he preferred to stay with the reigning Superleague Greece champions. On 17 April 2016, he was a key member for the club as it celebrated winning the domestic championship for the sixth consecutive season.

Tianjin Teda
Ideye left Olympiakos for Chinese Super League side Tianjin Teda in the January 2017 transfer window. Ideye joined the Chinese club on a two-and-a half-year contract for a transfer fee of €12 million. His contract, which ran until the summer of 2019, was worth €3.5 million per year.

Málaga (loan)
On 29 January 2018, Ideye joined Spanish La Liga side Málaga on loan for six months.

Aris
On 20 June 2019, he joined Aris on a one-year contract, for an annual fee of €500,000.

Ideye had to wait until mid September to find his first goal, when he scored in a stunning 4–0 home win against Panathinaikos, which was also the first of the season. One week later, he received a low cross from Giannis Fetfatzidis and sent the ball in the back of the net, opening the score in an away Derby of Thessaloniki against PAOK, which ended as a 2–2 draw. On 27 October 2019, he scored from the penalty spot, sealing a 2–0 home win against Panetolikos. On 14 December 2019, he returned to the starring line-up, after a two-game suspension, and scored in a 3–1 away loss against OFI. On 19 December 2019, Nigerian striker Brown Ideye netted after 12 and 25 minutes to set an irresistible Aris on their way to complete a hammering 4–0 win against Volos.

On 8 January 2020, he scored in a 1–0 away win against Xanthi, in the first leg of the round of 16 of the Greek Cup and in the rematch he netted another one, helping to a 2–1 win and a qualification to the quarter finals. On 22 February 2020, he scored an equalizer in a 2–2 away draw against Lamia.

On 14 June 2020, he scored in a 3–1 away loss against Olympiacos for the Superleague championship play-offs.

International career
Ideye represented his country at the 2007 FIFA U-20 World Cup in Canada. He played five games in the tournament and scored one goal, against Costa Rica. In May 2010, he was called up to the senior side as part of the 30-man team for the 2010 FIFA World Cup in South Africa. He was not part of the final 23-man squad, but was subsequently called up after a knee injury to Mikel John Obi ruled the midfielder out of the competition. Ideye was also called up to Nigeria's 23-man squad for the 2013 Africa Cup of Nations, playing in most of their games at the tournament. He scored Nigeria's second goal in their 4–1 semi-final win over Mali and played in their 1–0 win over Burkina Faso in the final.

Ideye was selected for Nigeria's squad at the 2013 FIFA Confederations Cup.

Career statistics

Club

International
As of match played 31 May 2016. Nigeria score listed first, score column indicates score after each Ideye goal.

Honours

Club
Dynamo Kyiv
Ukrainian Cup: 2013–14
Ukrainian Super Cup: 2011

Olympiacos
Super League Greece: 2015–16
Greek Cup runner-up: 2015–16

International
Nigeria
Africa Cup of Nations: 2013

References

External links

 
 
 Interview
 

1988 births
Living people
People from Yenagoa
Nigerian footballers
Nigeria international footballers
Nigeria under-20 international footballers
Neuchâtel Xamax FCS players
Ocean Boys F.C. players
FC Sochaux-Montbéliard players
FC Dynamo Kyiv players
West Bromwich Albion F.C. players
Olympiacos F.C. players
Tianjin Jinmen Tiger F.C. players
Málaga CF players
Aris Thessaloniki F.C. players
Göztepe S.K. footballers
Nigerian expatriate footballers
Swiss Super League players
Ligue 1 players
Premier League players
Ukrainian Premier League players
Super League Greece players
Chinese Super League players
La Liga players
Süper Lig players
Expatriate footballers in France
Expatriate footballers in Switzerland
Expatriate footballers in Ukraine
Expatriate footballers in England
Expatriate footballers in Greece
Expatriate footballers in China
Expatriate footballers in Spain
Expatriate footballers in Turkey
2010 FIFA World Cup players
2013 Africa Cup of Nations players
2013 FIFA Confederations Cup players
Africa Cup of Nations-winning players
Association football forwards
Nigerian expatriate sportspeople in France
Nigerian expatriate sportspeople in Switzerland
Nigerian expatriate sportspeople in Ukraine
Nigerian expatriate sportspeople in England
Nigerian expatriate sportspeople in Greece
Nigerian expatriate sportspeople in China
Nigerian expatriate sportspeople in Spain